Masasa Moyo is a Canadian television, film and voice actress.

Filmography

Film
 Kingdom Come (2001) - Delightful Slocumb
 Nosferatu L.A. '02 (2002) - Laytesha (voice)
 Paris (2003) - Golden Gate Bartender
 Woman Thou Art Loosed (2004) - Inmate #4
 Johnson Family Vacation (2004) - Theta #1
 Team America: World Police (2004) - Sarah (voice)
 Full Clip (2004) - Girlfriend #1
 Rugrats: Tales from the Crib: Three Jacks and a Beanstalk (2006) - Gospel Singer, Chorus (voice)
 Angels & Demons (2009) - South African Reporter #1
 Noah (2012) - Narial (voice)
 Holla II (2013) - Clare
 Sharp (2013) - Kajri Kaamil
 Planes: Fire and Rescue (2014) - Additional Voices
 Teen Titans: The Judas Contract (2017) - Karen Beecher/Bumblebee, Traci (voice)

Television
 webRIOT (1999) - Announcer (voice)
 Call Me Claus (2001) - Receptionist
 Men, Women & Dogs (2001) - Cindy Winters
 Whose Wedding Is It Anyway? (2003) - Narrator (voice)
 Phil of the Future (2004) – Ms. Levy
 Curb Your Enthusiasm (2004) - Nurse
 CSI: Crime Scene Investigation (2004) - Inmate #1

Animation

 The Jellies (2015)
 The Powerpuff Girls (2017) - Additional Voices

Video games

References

External links
 
 

Living people
Canadian film actresses
Canadian television actresses
Canadian video game actresses
Canadian voice actresses
Canadian expatriate actresses in the United States
Actresses from London, Ontario
20th-century Canadian actresses
21st-century Canadian actresses
Year of birth missing (living people)